Historisches Stadttheater Weißenhorn is a theatre in Weißenhorn, Bavaria, Germany.

Theatres in Bavaria